Madison Brengle was the defending champion and successfully defended her title, defeating Panna Udvardy in the final, 6–3, 6–1.

Seeds

Draw

Finals

Top half

Bottom half

References

External Links
Main Draw

Mercer Tennis Classic - Singles